The Mutual and Balanced Force Reductions (MBFR) talks were a series of negotiations held in Vienna between NATO and Warsaw Pact countries between 1973 and 1989.

Origins
The MBFR talks were first proposed at the SALT meeting between President Richard M. Nixon and General Secretary Leonid Brezhnev. The two leaders agreed that the political side of the talks would be held by the Conference on Security and Cooperation in Europe (CSCE), while talks dealing with the military side would take place at MBFR.

The preliminary talks started in Vienna in January 1973. At the first meeting, the Russian side rejected the name "MBFR" on the grounds that the word "balanced" suggested that the Warsaw Pact forces – which had a numerical superiority in Europe – should be reduced more than NATO forces. Their proposed alternative was "Mutual Reductions of Forces and Armaments in Central Europe" (MRFACE), a title that was agreed upon but seldom used.

Aims
The aim of the negotiations was an agreement on disarmament and control of conventional arms and armed forces in the territories of Federal Republic of Germany, the Netherlands, Belgium and Luxembourg (from NATO) and  East Germany, Czechoslovakia and Poland (from the Warsaw Pact). The talks were attended by representatives from these nations, as well as the United States, United Kingdom, Canada and the Soviet Union.

History
The first meeting was held on 30 October 1973 in the Hofburg Palace, Vienna. John Thomson, leader of the British delegation, commented:

1973 proposals
The West put its first proposals on the table on 22 November 1973. This 2-phase plan consisted of the following requirements:
Phase 1: US to remove 29,000 soldiers; USSR to remove a tank army (5 divisions, 1,700 tanks, and 68,000 troops)
Phase 2: A limit to be placed on both sides to 700,000 ground forces and 200,000 air forces combined. (This was the NATO position throughout the negotiations.)

The Warsaw pact response to NATO's position was that each side should reduce its forces proportionally rather than absolutely, and that equipment as well as troop numbers should be reduced.
Each side should cut their forces by 20,000
A subsequent 15 per cent manpower and equipment reduction in manpower  by every country in NATO and the Warsaw Pact.

1976
The Warsaw Pact countries submitted a proposal that the USSR and the US should reduce manpower by 2 to 3 per cent, and that both the US and the USSR would remove the same number of  nuclear warheads, 354 nuclear-capable aircraft, a number of SCUD-B and Pershing I launchers, 300 tanks and a corps headquarters.

In 1976, the different estimates for the number of forces the Warsaw Pact countries were fielding in Eastern Europe became an issue that was never resolved during the period of the talks. (In 1976 the Warsaw Pact gave figures of 815,000 ground force personnel and 182,000 air force personnel, whilst NATO estimated that the Warsaw Pact had 956,000 and 224,000 personnel respectively.)

1979
In December 1979 the Soviets held up the talks because of NATO's decision to site new intermediate-range nuclear missiles in Europe.

Talks end
The talks ended in on 2 February 1989 and were replaced by the Treaty on Conventional Armed Forces in Europe.

References

Arms control treaties
Cold War
Soviet Union–United States relations
NATO relations
Warsaw Pact